The Anim or Fly River languages are a language family in south-central New Guinea established by Usher & Suter (2015). The names of the family derive from the Fly River and from the Proto-Anim word *anim 'people'.

Languages
The 17 Anim languages belong to the following four subfamilies:

Inland Gulf
Tirio (Lower Fly River)
Boazi (Lake Murray)
Marind (Marind–Yaqai)

The moribund Abom language, previously considered a member of the Tirio family, is of uncertain classification, possibly Trans–New Guinea, but does not appear to be Anim. The extinct Karami language, attested only in a short word list and previously assigned to the Inland Gulf family, defies classification (Usher and Suter 2015).

Anim languages and respective demographic information listed by Evans (2018) are provided below.

{| 
|+ List of Anim languages
! Language !! Subgroup !! Location !! Population !! Alternate names
|-
| Marind || Nuclear Marind || central Merauke Regency and southeast corner (Indonesia) || 7,000 || 
|-
| Bian || Nuclear Marind || northeast Merauke Regency (Indonesia) || 2,900 || 
|-
| Yaqay || Yaqay || eastern Mappi Regency (Indonesia) || 10,000 || 
|-
| Warkay-Bipim || Yaqay || south Asmat Regency (Indonesia) || 300 || 
|-
| Kuni-Boazi || Lake Murray (Boazi) || west Lake Murray (PNG) || 4,500 || 
|-
|-
| Tirio || Tirio (Lower Fly) || south bank of lower Fly River (PNG) || 1900 || Makayam
|-
| Bitur || Tirio (Lower Fly) || south bank of lower Fly River (PNG) || 860 || Mutum, Paswam, Bituri
|-
| Adulu || Tirio (Lower Fly) || south Gogodala Rural LLG (PNG) || 220 || Aturu
|-
| Lewada-Dewara || Tirio (Lower Fly) || Gogodala Rural LLG (PNG) || 700 || Were
|-
| Baramu || Tirio (Lower Fly) || south bank of lower Fly River (PNG) || 850 || 
|-
| Ipiko || Ipiko (Inland Gulf) || West Kikori Rural LLG (PNG) ||  || 
|}

Reconstruction

Phonemes

Usher (2020) reconstructs the consonant inventory as follows:

{| 
| *m || *n ||  ||  
|-
| *p || *t ||  || *k 
|-
| *mb || *nd ||  || *ŋg 
|-
| *ɸ || *s ||  ||  
|-
| *w || *r || *j ||  
|}

Vowels are *a *e *i *o *u.

Pronouns
Proto-Anim pronouns (Usher and Suter 2015):

{| class="wikitable"
!  !! sg !! pl
|-
! 1
| *na- || *ni-
|-
! 2
| *ŋga- || *ja
|-
! 3
| *(u)a- || *ja
|}

By 2020, comparison with the neighboring TNG branch Awyu–Ok had led so some revision of the reconstructions. Here are the nominative and possessive/object forms:

{| class="wikitable"
!  !! sg !! pl
|-
! 1
| *no, *na- || *ni, *na-/*ni-
|-
! 2
| *ŋgo, **ŋga- || *[i/e]o, *[i/e]a-
|-
! 3m
| *e, *e- ||rowspan=2| *i, *i-
|-
! 3f
| *u, *u-
|}

The demonstrative third-person forms *e-, *u-, *i- are an innovation shared with proto-Awyu–Ok, which has the same vowel ablaut in the second person as well. They reflect a gender ablaut of msg *e, fsg *u, nsg *[a/o], and pl *i, as in *anem 'man', *anum 'woman', *anim 'people', or *we 'father', *wu 'mother', *wi 'parents'.

Lexicon
Proto-Anim lexical reconstructions by Usher & Suter (2015) are:

{| class="wikitable sortable"
! gloss !! Proto-Anim
|-
| ‘house’ || *aɸ(a,o)
|-
| ‘younger sibling’ || *am(o)=e/*am=u
|-
| ‘laugh’ || *awend(V)
|-
| ‘thigh’ || *mboɸo
|-
| ‘breast’ || *mbumb(V)
|-
| ‘tree’ || *nde
|-
| ‘navel’ || *ndekum(u)
|-
| ‘sago’ || *ndou
|-
| ‘build a nest’ || *ewes
|-
| ‘bone’ || *ɸia(u)
|-
| ‘rain’ || *ŋg(a,o)e
|-
| ‘night’ || *ŋgap(o)
|-
| ‘eat, drink’ || *ŋg(e,a)i
|-
| ‘root’ || *itit(i)
|-
| ‘lip’ || *itup(u)
|-
| ‘cry’ || *iwo
|-
| ‘tooth’ || *kam(V)
|-
| ‘egg, seed’ || *kan(a,e)
|-
| ‘paddle’ || *kawea
|-
| ‘mouth, teeth’ || *maŋg(a,o)t(o)
|-
| ‘come’ || *mano
|-
| ‘speech, voice’ || *mean(V)
|-
| ‘two’ || *measi
|-
| ‘fruit, seed’ || *moko(m)
|-
| ‘heart’ || *muki(k)
|-
| ‘mosquito’ || *naŋg(a,i)t(i)
|-
| ‘banana’ || *napet(o)
|-
| ‘sleep’ || *nu
|-
| ‘forearm’ || *piŋgi
|-
| ‘stand’ || *ratinV
|-
| ‘hand’ || *seŋga
|-
| ‘tongue’ || *sas(a)
|-
| ‘meat, fish’ || *sawa(i)
|-
| ‘tail feathers’ || *sum(V)
|-
| ‘fire, tree’ || *tae
|-
| ‘wing’ || *taɸ(u)
|-
| ‘nape’ || *temuk(u)
|-
| ‘lie down’ || *tenV
|}

Below are selected reconstructions for Proto-Fly River (Proto-Anim) and branches by Usher (2020).

{| class="wikitable sortable"
! gloss !! Proto-Fly River !! Proto-Inland Gulf !! Proto-Lower Fly River !! Proto-Lake Murray !! Proto-Marind-Yaqay !! Proto-Marind !! Proto-Yakhai-Warkay !! Proto-Yakhai
|-
! head
|  || *gia ||  ||  ||  || *pa || *muku || 
|-
! hair
|  ||  || *duɾumə; *duɾum ||  ||  ||  ||  || 
|-
! ear
|  || *tu; *jeja || *towap ||  || *kambet || *kembet, *kambet || *k[e]mbet || 
|-
! eye
| *kindV[C] || *kuɸino || *baɾid ||  || *kind || *kind || *kind || 
|-
! nose
|  || *dasi || *miw ||  ||  || *aŋgi₂p || *s[e/a]maŋg || 
|-
! tooth
| *kam || *ta; *bese || *suwə; *kam; *su || *kam || *maŋg[e/a]t || *maŋgat || *maŋg[e/a]t || 
|-
! tongue
| *sas || *koda; *sasa || *jimə; *jim || *naseam; *sas || *inVm || *inum || *in[e/a]m || 
|-
! leg
|  || *idini ||  ||  ||  || *tegu ||  || 
|-
! louse
| *n[u]m[u]ŋg || *uani || *oɾ[eae]n || *[num]uŋg || *nambun || *nahun; *mba[m/mb] || *nambun || 
|-
! dog
|  || *gaso || *s[eae]; *diɾean || *gaɣo ||  || *ŋgat ||  || 
|-
! pig
| *mbasik || *maɸa || *m[i/e]nawə || *basik || *basik || *basik || *basik || 
|-
! bird
|  || *ewesa || *dawod ||  ||  || *ujub ||  || *pet[e/a]ɣau
|-
! egg
| *kanV || *ɸutu; *usu || *sVɣaɾə ||  || *mogaw; *kan[a] || *magaw || *mo[k/ɣ]a || 
|-
! blood
|  ||  || *nauɾə || *kouk ||  || *do ||  || 
|-
! bone
| *mbai[a]ŋg; *ɸia[u] || *ɸia || *naɾak(ə); *baig || *bajag || *hia[u] || *haiau, *hiau || *hia || *ia
|-
! skin
|  || *nikopi; *ko[j]ipo ||  || *ŋgusum ||  || *ugu ||  || 
|-
! breast
|  || *jono || *bub || *toto ||  || *bub || *abut || 
|-
! tree
| *nde || *de || *naukə || *tae || *de || *de || *de || 
|-
! man
| *anem || *aneme || *anem(ə) || *anem || *anem || *anem ||  || 
|-
! woman
| *anum || *anumu || *anum(ə) || *anum || *anum || *anum ||  || *sau
|-
! sun
|  || *nowumu; *siwio || *manom || *kaia ||  || *katane ||  || 
|-
! moon
|  || *bubei || *manom ||  ||  || *mandou || *kam[e/o] || 
|-
! water
|  || *ogo || *mau[g/k]ə || *neia, *naia || *adika || *adeka || *adika || *maⁱ
|-
! fire
| *tae || *maɸi; *ta[j]e || *j[i]au || *tae || *tekaw || *tekaw || *teka || 
|-
! stone
|  ||  || *didigə ||  || *seŋgV || *ketaɾ; *seŋga || *seŋgV || *seŋgi
|-
! path
|  || *jigei || *ewean ||  ||  || *isas ||  || 
|-
! name
|  || *jiga || *gag || *ij || *[i/e]g[i/e]j || *igij || *[e][k/ɣ][e] || 
|-
! eat
|  ||  || *tamu ||  ||  || *ɣawi[ɣ] ||  || *bae
|-
! one
| *ija (?) || *jaigio || *ɣoɾ[e]a[u][k] || *koapo || *ija[kod] || *ijako[d]; *ijakod ||  || 
|-
! two
| *meas[i] || *measi || *mis ||  ||  || *inah ||  || *[k/ɣ]aiaɣamat
|}

References

External links 
 Timothy Usher & Edgar Suter, New Guinea World, Proto–Fly River (see also reconstructions of branches)

 
Trans–New Guinea languages